Leonel Cárcamo Batres (born May 5, 1965) is a retired Salvadoran football player.

Club career
Cárcamo has played all of his professional career at hometown club Luis Ángel Firpo, becoming a club legend in the process. Snapped up by Firpo from lower league outfit Carrera when still in his teens, he won seven league titles in 17 years with the club. He scored the decisive penalty in the penalty shoot-out against Cojutepeque to hand Los Pamperos their first league title in 1989. He was part of the most successful team in the history of the club, lining up alongside players like Marlon Menjívar, Mauricio Cienfuegos, Raúl Díaz Arce and his longtime central defensive partner  Giovanni Trigueros.

International career
Cárcamo made his debut for El Salvador in 1988 and has amassed a total of 84 caps in 13 years, scoring no goals. He has represented his country in 27 FIFA World Cup qualification matches and played at the 1993 and 1997 UNCAF Nations Cups and at the 1996 and 1998 CONCACAF Gold Cups.

His final international game was a July 2000 friendly match in Los Angeles against Guatemala.

Personal life
Cárcamo is married with Consuelo Madelín Sánchez and the couple have three children: Madelín, Leonel and Osvaldo.

References

External links

 El adiós de Leonel - El Diario de Hoy 

1965 births
Living people
People from Usulután Department
Association football defenders
Salvadoran footballers
El Salvador international footballers
1996 CONCACAF Gold Cup players
1997 UNCAF Nations Cup players
1998 CONCACAF Gold Cup players
C.D. Luis Ángel Firpo footballers
Salvadoran football managers
C.D. Luis Ángel Firpo managers